Lai Neir is a small lake on Alp Flix, in the Grisons, Switzerland. It is listed in the Inventory of Raised and Transitional Bogs of National Importance.

Lai Neir and Lai Blos are part of Alp Flix, a site listed in the Inventory of Mire Landscapes of Particular Beauty and National Importance.

Lakes of Graubünden
Lakes of Switzerland
Surses